Marie Lebec (born 17 December 1990) is a French politician of La République En Marche! (LREM) who has been serving as a member of the French National Assembly since the 2017 elections, representing the department of Yvelines. She is considered a close ally of President Emmanuel Macron.

Early life 
Marie Lebec was born on 17 December 1990 in Vernon, in the French department of Eure. She graduated from the Institut d'études politiques de Bordeaux in public affairs and from the Cardiff University in European and international affairs.

Professional career 
Lebec has been a lobbyist for the consulting firm Euralia, from which she takes leave to stand for the legislative elections in 2017.

Political career
In parliament, Lebec serves as member of the Committee on Economic Affairs. In addition to her committee assignments, she chairs the French-Ivorian Parliamentary Friendship Group.

Since 2019, Lebec has been part of the LREM parliamentary group's leadership around its chairman Gilles Le Gendre. In 2020, she assisted Le Gendre with coordinating the parliamentary group's support for the government's pension reform plans.

Political positions
In July 2019, Lebec voted in favor of the French ratification of the European Union’s Comprehensive Economic and Trade Agreement (CETA) with Canada.

See also
 2017 French legislative election

References

1990 births
Living people
Deputies of the 15th National Assembly of the French Fifth Republic
La République En Marche! politicians
21st-century French women politicians
People from Vernon, Eure
Women members of the National Assembly (France)
Alumni of Cardiff University
Politicians from Normandy
Members of Parliament for Yvelines
Deputies of the 16th National Assembly of the French Fifth Republic